Fulham Fallout is the studio debut album of UK punk band The Lurkers. The original album was released in June 1978 on the Beggar's Banquet label and hit number 57 on the UK Album Chart in its first week. The re-release on Captain Oi! Records added another twelve tracks of singles and demos to the original set of fourteen tracks.

The style on this album is a good demonstration of how they earned the nickname "The British Ramones".

Track listing 

Side One
 "Ain't Got a Clue" (Stride)
 "I Don't Need to Tell Her" (Stride)
 "Total War" (Stride)
 "Hey You" (Bradshaw)
 "Shadow" (Stride)
 "Then I Kicked Her" (Phil Spector, Ellie Greenwich, Jeff Barry)
 "Go, Go, Go" (Moore)
 "Jenny" (Stride)
 "Time of Year" (Stride)
 "Self Destruct" (Stride)
 "It's Quiet Here" (Esso, Stride)
 "Gerald" (The Lurkers)
 "I'm on Heat" (Stride)
 "Be My Prisoner" (Stride)

CD Reissue Included
 "Shadow" (Single Version)
 "Love Story"
 "Freak Show"
 "Mass Media Believer"
 "Ooh! Ooh! I Love You"
 "Pills" (Bo Diddley)
 "We Are the Chaos Bros." 
 "Be My Prisoner" (Streets Compilation version)
 "Total War" (Demo)
 "Then I Kissed Her" ("Then I Kicked Her" Demo)
 "I Love the Dark" (LP Demo)
 "Freak Show" (LP Demo)

Personnel

Howard Wall - vocals
Pete Stride - guitar, vocals
Peter "Esso" Haynes - drums, vocals, glockenspiel
Nigel Moore - bass, vocals
Pete "Plug" Edwards - harmonica, backing vocals

External links 
 https://web.archive.org/web/20120207035439/http://www.thelurkers.co.uk/news.htm

1978 debut albums
Beggars Banquet Records albums
The Lurkers albums